Mario Alberto Yepes Díaz (born 13 January 1976) is a Colombian former professional footballer who played as a centre-back. He is well known for his time in Paris Saint-Germain, where he was considered to be one of the best defenders at the time, being dubbed by fans as "Super Mario". During his time in Italy with Chievo, he earned a reputation in the media as a solid and physical old-fashioned man-marking centre-back, known as a "stopper" in Italian football jargon. He served as the captain of the Colombia national team between 2008 and 2014.

Having begun his career in 1999, and having played for the Colombia national team during that period, Yepes is one of only two players that can truly be considered to be part of the late 1990s and early 2000s golden generation of Colombian football which won the 2001 Copa América and ended in 2003, but has also been part of Colombia's present golden generation (which began in 2013). Faryd Mondragón is the other Colombian footballer of the two, but officially retired in 2014.

Yepes began his managerial career with hometown club Deportivo Cali, whom he managed from 2016 to 2017.

Club career

Early career
Mario Yepes started his playing career in 1994 with Cortuluá, as a forward before Cortulua's coach converted him to a libero (sweeper).

Yepes signed for his home town club Deportivo Cali in 1998. He won a Colombian championship with Deportivo Cali. He was part of the squad for the 1999 Copa Libertadores.

In 1999, he joined River Plate in Argentina, where he won two Argentine Primera championships.

In 2002, Yepes moved to Europe, signing for Nantes in the French Ligue 1. After two-and-half personally successful seasons with Nantes, Yepes joined fellow Ligue 1 side Paris Saint-Germain in 2004. Yepes would become a mainstay in the PSG side winning the Coupe de France in 2006 and the Coupe de la Ligue in 2008, though he did not feature in the second final.

In 2008, Yepes joined Chievo in Italy. He signed a new long-term contract in summer 2009.

A.C. Milan

In March 2010, Chievo teammate Sergio Pellissier confirmed that Yepes would join Milan in the summer, when his contract ran out.

Yepes got to Milan in the 2010–11 season but was quickly deployed as a substitute due to the starting centre-back being Thiago Silva. Yepes played few games in the Italian Serie A, but participated in the UEFA Champions League. Yepes was close to scoring with Milan in the UEFA Champions League match against Tottenham Hotspur, in which he had two clear chances of scoring with a header, but was denied twice by Tottenham keeper Heurelho Gomes.

Yepes scored his first goal for Milan on 23 October 2011, where he finished off a comeback against Lecce, scoring the fourth and winning goal for Milan in the 83rd minute to drive the Rossoneri to a 4–3 victory, with Kevin-Prince Boateng scoring a hat-trick to level the scores after a 3–0 losing position.

On 12 May 2012, Yepes signed a one-year extension contract with Milan, keeping him at the club until the summer of 2013. After being an irregular player during the following season, however, Yepes stated that he would not sign a new contract with the club despite being offered the chance, expressing that he needed more "guaranteed" playing time in order to better prepare himself for the 2014 FIFA World Cup. He later confirmed that Milan would not offer him as such and his reason for departure.

Atalanta
On 14 July 2013, Yepes signed a one-year contract with Serie A club Atalanta. He made 26 appearances during the 2013–14 season and left the club at the end of the term.

San Lorenzo
On 13 September 2014, Argentine Primera División club San Lorenzo announced the signing of Yepes on a deal valid until the end of 2015. On 20 January 2016, he officially retired from professional football, joining Deportivo Cali as manager four months later.

International career

Yepes has played 102 matches for the Colombia national team since his debut in 1999, making him the second-most capped Colombian player of all time, after Carlos Valderrama. He was part of the Colombia squad that won the Copa América in 2001. and was also in the squads for three other editions of the tournament in 1999, 2007 and 2011.

During the team's 2014 FIFA World Cup qualifying campaign, Yepes made 12 appearances as Colombia qualified for its first finals since 1998. In the final qualifying match, Yepes scored both goals in a 2–1 victory against Paraguay.

Due to his age during the 2014 World Cup qualifiers, Yepes expressed his passion for the national team and wanting to retire either after the World Cup qualifiers or during the 2014 World Cup. José Pékerman promised to meet with his retirement request. On 17 December 2013, Yepes announced that he would retire after the 2014 World Cup.

On 14 June 2014, Yepes made his first appearance in the FIFA World Cup finals stage at age 38, captaining Colombia to a 3–0 win over Greece in Belo Horizonte. Yepes was the oldest outfield player at the 2014 World Cup, and the second-oldest overall, after compatriot Faryd Mondragón.

On 19 June 2014, Yepes earned his 100th cap for Colombia in the second group stage match against the Ivory Coast, becoming the third Colombian player to reach the milestone after Valderrama and Leonel Álvarez. He led Colombia to its best ever World Cup performance as they reached the quarter-finals for the first time in their history, where they lost 2–1 to tournament hosts Brazil.

Managerial career 
In late April 2016 Mario Alberto Yepes was named as manager of Deportivo Cali, which became his first managerial experience. Yepes came to replace Fernando "Pecoso" Castro, who had been dismissed for the poor recent results, especially the early elimination of Copa Libertadores and the farewell of the event at the hands of Boca Juniors with a 6–2 rout. Yepes's coaching team had Freddy Hurtado and Julián Barragán as assistants, and Daniel Curbelo as physical trainer. During his period as coach, Deportivo Cali was eliminated in the quarterfinals of the domestic league twice (at the hands of Independiente Medellín in the Apertura and Atlético Bucaramanga in the Finalización), and qualified for the 2017 Copa Sudamericana. However, a streak of poor performances in the start of the 2017 season plus a poor record while playing away from home, led to his exit from the club on 9 March 2017.

Personal life 
Yepes is married to Colombian Carolina Villegas. He and his wife have three children, his son Luciano Yepes was born in May 2002, his second son Valentino Yepes was born on 23 September 2012, and his daughter Miranda Yepes was born in April 2005.

Career statistics

Club

International

Scores and results list Colombia's goal tally first, score column indicates score after each Yepes goal.

Honours

Deportivo Cali
Categoría Primera A: 1998
Copa Libertadores: runner-up 1999
 
River Plate
Argentine Primera División: Apertura 1999, Clausura 2000

Paris Saint-Germain
Coupe de France: 2005–06
Coupe de la Ligue: 2007–08
Trophée des Champions: runner-up 2006

A.C. Milan
Serie A: 2010–11
Supercoppa Italiana: 2011

San Lorenzo
Recopa Sudamericana: runner-up 2015
FIFA Club World Cup: runner-up 2014

Colombia
Copa América: 2001

See also
 List of men's footballers with 100 or more international caps

Notes and references

External links

MarioYepes.co

1976 births
Living people
Footballers from Cali
Colombian footballers
Colombia international footballers
Colombian expatriate footballers
Association football defenders
FIFA Century Club
Categoría Primera A players
Argentine Primera División players
Ligue 1 players
Serie A players
Cortuluá footballers
Deportivo Cali footballers
Deportivo Cali managers
Club Atlético River Plate footballers
Colombian people of French descent
FC Nantes players
Paris Saint-Germain F.C. players
A.C. ChievoVerona players
A.C. Milan players
Atalanta B.C. players
San Lorenzo de Almagro footballers
Expatriate footballers in Argentina
Expatriate footballers in France
Expatriate footballers in Italy
1999 Copa América players
2001 Copa América players
2003 FIFA Confederations Cup players
2007 Copa América players
2011 Copa América players
2014 FIFA World Cup players
Copa América-winning players
Colombian football managers